Chester Arthur Phillips (July 17, 1882 – December 1, 1976) was an acting President of the University of Iowa, serving in 1940. Phillips Hall at the university is named for him.

External links
 
 

Presidents of the University of Iowa
1882 births
1976 deaths
20th-century American academics